Glenister Fermoy Sheil  (21 October 192929 September 2008) was an Australian politician, representing the National Party in the Senate for the state of Queensland from 1974 to 1981, and again from 1984–90. He was an amateur tennis player who competed at the Australian Championships in the 1940s and 1950s.

Biography
Glen Sheil was born in Sydney and moved to Queensland at a young age. He attended The Southport School on the Gold Coast and studied medicine at the University of Queensland, after which he was a medical practitioner. He also owned the Dungarvan Private Hospital in Brisbane.

He was elected to the Senate at the 1974 election, taking his seat immediately on 18 May because the election followed a double dissolution. In an early parliamentary speech, he read the Lord's Prayer in nine South African languages.  He was re-elected in 1975.

After the 1977 election, Malcolm Fraser announced the make-up of the new ministry that he would be recommending to the Governor-General.  Sheil was to be Minister for Veterans' Affairs.  This announcement was made at 5 p.m. on 19 December 1977.  On 20 December he was sworn as a member of the Federal Executive Council, a constitutional pre-requisite for appointment as a minister. That same day, in an interview on ABC Radio, he professed his support for the South African apartheid system, which was very much at odds with the Fraser government's position.

Fraser decided not to proceed with Sheil's appointment to the ministry.  In a very rare move, he advised the Governor-General, Sir Zelman Cowen, to terminate Sheil's appointment as an Executive Councillor (such appointments are normally for life). Cowen was required by convention to act on the Prime Minister's advice, and the termination occurred at midday on 21 December.

This was widely described as "the shortest ministerial career in Australia's history". In fact, Sheil was never a minister at all, but he was a member of the Executive Council for two days.

On 6 February 1981 he resigned from the Senate to contest a by-election for the House of Representatives seat of McPherson. He was defeated by Liberal Party candidate Peter White. The casual vacancy caused by his resignation was filled by Florence Bjelke-Petersen, the wife of the then-Premier of Queensland, Joh Bjelke-Petersen.

At the 1984 election on 1 December, he was re-elected to the Senate, again taking his seat immediately because the Senate was being increased from 64 to 76 members.  He was defeated at the 1990 election, his term expiring on 30 June 1990.

Other
Sheil led the joint Australian Monarchist League (AML) and Queenslanders for Constitutional Monarchy (QCM) ticket in the campaign to send candidates to the Australian Constitutional Convention 1998 which was held in Canberra from 2–13 February in that year.

Active in tennis, rugby and cricket in Queensland, he was known as "Thumpa", a nickname from a rabbit-farming company he part-owned.

Death
Glen Sheil died on 29 September 2008, aged 78.

Bibliography
 Footnotes to History (3 vols.)
 A Companion to the Australian Constitution on Understanding the Constitution.

References

External links
 
 Queenslanders for Constitutional Monarchy
 Portrait of Dr Glenister Sheil taken at the Constitutional Convention, Canberra, 2–13 February 1998
 ATO: Sheil v. Federal Commissioner of Taxation
 Bookfinder.com

Members of the Australian Senate
Members of the Australian Senate for Queensland
Australian monarchists
Delegates to the Australian Constitutional Convention 1998
National Party of Australia members of the Parliament of Australia
Australian Companions of the Order of St Michael and St George
Australian male tennis players
1929 births
2008 deaths
People educated at the Southport School
Australian sportsperson-politicians
20th-century Australian politicians
Tennis people from Queensland